Jean Noël Éric Desjardins (born June 14, 1969) is a Canadian former professional ice hockey defenceman who played 17 seasons in the National Hockey League (NHL) with the Montreal Canadiens and Philadelphia Flyers. He won the Stanley Cup with Montreal in 1993 and headlined the Flyers defence for over a decade. He currently works for his own business.

Playing career
Desjardins was drafted 38th overall in the 1987 NHL Entry Draft by the Montreal Canadiens from the Granby Bisons of the Quebec Major Junior Hockey League (QMJHL). After playing one more season for Granby, he joined the Sherbrooke Canadiens of the American Hockey League (AHL) in time to make his professional debut in the spring of 1988, playing three regular season games and four playoff games. He began his NHL career in 1988–89 with two goals and twelve assists in 36 games. He also played in 14 playoff games on Montreal's way to the 1989 Stanley Cup Finals, a loss against the Calgary Flames.

His play improved thereafter, leading to an appearance in the 1992 NHL All-Star Game. By 1992–93 he had established himself as one of the team's premier defencemen, often playing in power play situations with Mathieu Schneider. Perhaps his most famous performance happened in game two of the 1993 Stanley Cup Finals on June 3, 1993, when he scored all of Montreal's goals in a 3–2 overtime win over the Los Angeles Kings in a game also marked by Marty McSorley's illegal stick penalty. The game turned the series in Montreal's favour.

On February 9, 1995, Desjardins was traded to the Philadelphia Flyers along with John LeClair and Gilbert Dionne in exchange for Mark Recchi and a 3rd round pick in the 1995 NHL Entry Draft (Martin Hohenberger). He was brought in to solidify the Flyers defence and that he did as he won the first of what would be seven Barry Ashbee Trophies, an award given annually to the Flyers top blueliner. He played the remainder of his career with the Flyers, achieving two NHL second team All-Star selections (1999, 2000) and two more All-Star Game appearances (1996, 2000). His 396 points with the Flyers ranks second among defencemen only to Mark Howe's 480 in team history. During the 1999–2000 season, Desjardins became the Flyers captain once Eric Lindros was stripped from captainship for his complaints about the Flyers' medical staff.

The Flyers didn't offer Desjardins a contract following the 2005–06 season. His original team, Montreal, was interested in signing him for the 2006–07 season, but Desjardins opted to retire as a Flyer on August 10, 2006.  Desjardins was nicknamed Rico throughout his playing career.

On January 11, 2007, before the Flyers/Canadiens game in Philadelphia, the Flyers honoured Desjardins with Eric Desjardins Night, which featured a ceremony highlighting Desjardins' Flyers career. Afterwards, Desjardins was presented gifts and tokens of appreciation from both the Flyers and the Canadiens, his two former clubs.

On February 19, 2015, before the Flyers/Sabres game in Philadelphia, the Flyers inducted Desjardins into the Flyers Hall of Fame. His former defense partner Chris Therien honored him with a speech.

Records
June 3, 1993: First and to date only defenceman to score a hat-trick in a Stanley Cup Finals game.

Career statistics

Regular season and playoffs

International

All-Star Games

Awards

See also
List of NHL players with 1000 games played

References

External links
 

1969 births
Canadian ice hockey coaches
Canadian ice hockey defencemen
Granby Bisons players
Ice hockey people from Quebec
Ice hockey players at the 1998 Winter Olympics
Living people
Montreal Canadiens draft picks
Montreal Canadiens players
National Hockey League All-Stars
Olympic ice hockey players of Canada
Philadelphia Flyers captains
Philadelphia Flyers coaches
Philadelphia Flyers players
Sherbrooke Canadiens players
Stanley Cup champions
Sportspeople from Rouyn-Noranda